The Canadian Arts & Fashion Awards (CAFA) are an annual award ceremony to recognize and celebrate outstanding achievement and emerging talent in Canadian fashion. The awards were established to encourage the economic development of the Canadian fashion industry and endorse Canadian cultural sovereignty. The event started in January 2014.

The awards include: Womenswear Designer of the Year, Menswear Designer of the Year, The Swarovski Award for Emerging Talent in Fashion, The Swarovski Award for Emerging Talent in Accessories, The Outstanding Achievement Award, Accessory Designer of the Year, The Sephora Image Maker Award, The Hudson's Bay International Canadian Designer of the Year Award, Yorkdale Stylist of the Year, Model of the Year, and Fashion Blogger of the Year.

Members of the jury in 2015 included philanthropist Suzanne A. Rogers, VP of Holt Renfrew Lisa Tant, VP & buying director of The Room, The BAY Nicholas Mellamphy, editor-in-chief of Elle Canada Noreen Flanagan, Coco Rocha, chair and associate professor at Ryerson University Robert Ott, and executive director of the Toronto Fashion Incubator Susan Langdon.

Award winners have included Coco Rocha, Beaufille, Marie Saint Pierre, Philippe Dubuc, Mikhael Kale, Jerome C. Rousseau, Sid Neigum, Tommy Ton, Erdem Moralioğlu, Zeina Esmail, Anais Pouliot, Jeremy Laing, DSQUARED, and Joe Mimran.

2019 Winners 
The 2019 Canadian Arts & Fashion Awards winners are:

Womenswear Designer of the Year: Sid Neigum.

Menswear Designer of the Year: Christopher Bates (fashion designer).

Emerging talent, fashion: Marie-Ève Lecavalier.

Emerging talent, accessories: Corey Moranis.

Accessory Designer of the Year: Dean Davidson.

Outerwear Brand of the Year: Mackage.

Fashion Innovation Award: Focals by North.

Fashion Design Student Award: Marie-Eve Aubry.

Imagemaker of the Year: Max Abadian.

Stylist of the Year: Cary Tauben.

Fresh Face (emerging model) of the Year: Krow Kian.

Model of the Year: Tasha Tilberg.

Fashion Impact Award: Matt & Nat.

Digital Fashion Influencer of the Year: Fecal Matter.

Sustainability Award: KOTN.

Makeup Artist of the Year: Hung Vanngo.

Hair Artist of the Year: Harry Josh.

Suzanne A. Rogers Award for International Development: Sid Neigum.

See also

 List of fashion awards

References

External links
CAFA homepage

Fashion awards
Arts awards in Canada
Annual events in Canada
Awards established in 2014
2014 establishments in Canada